Pileru Assembly constituency is a constituency of Andhra Pradesh Legislative Assembly, India. It is one of 6 constituencies in Annamayya district. There are 6 mandals in Pileru Constituency.

Mandals

Members of Legislative Assembly

Assembly Elections 1952

Assembly Elections 2009

Assembly Elections 2014

Assembly Elections 2019

References

Assembly constituencies of Andhra Pradesh